Aircraft maneuvering is referenced to a standard rate turn, also known as a rate one turn (ROT).

A standard rate turn is defined as a 3° per second turn, which completes a 360° turn in 2 minutes. This is known as a 2-minute turn, or rate one (180°/min). Fast airplanes, or aircraft on certain precision approaches, use a half standard rate ('rate half' in some countries), but the definition of standard rate does not change.

Usage 

Standardized turn rates are often employed in approaches and holding patterns to provide a reference for controllers and pilots so that each will know what the other is expecting. The pilot banks the airplane such that the turn and slip indicator points to the mark appropriate for that aircraft and then uses a clock to time the turn. The pilot can roll out at any desired direction depending on the length of time in the turn.

During a constant-bank level turn, increasing airspeed decreases the rate of turn, and increases the turn radius. A rate half turn (1.5° per second) is normally used when flying faster than 250 kn.  The term rate two turn (6° per second) is used on some low speed aircraft.

Instrumentation 

Instruments, either the turn and slip indicator or the turn coordinator, have the standard rate or half standard rate turn clearly marked. Slower aircraft are equipped with 2-minute turn indicators while faster aircraft are often equipped with 4-minute turn indicators.

Formulae

Angle of bank formula 

The formula for calculating the angle of bank for a specific true airspeed (TAS) in SI units (or other coherent system) is:

For a rate-one turn and velocity in knots (nautical miles per hour, symbol kn), this comes to

.

A convenient approximation for the bank angle in degrees is

For aircraft holding purposes, the International Civil Aviation Organization (ICAO) mandates that all turns should be made, "at a bank angle of 25° or at a rate of 3° per second, whichever requires the lesser bank." By the above formula, a rate-one turn at a TAS greater than 180 knots would require a bank angle of more than 25°. Therefore, faster aircraft just use 25° for their turns.

Radius of turn formula 

One might also want to calculate the radius  of a Rate 1, 2 or 3 turn at a specific TAS.

Where  is the rate of turn.

If the velocity and the angle of bank is given,

where g is the gravitational acceleration. This is a simplified formula that ignores slip and returns zero for 90° of bank.

In metres (where gravity is approximately 9.81 metres per second per second, and velocity is given in metres per second): 

Or in feet (where velocity is given in knots):

References 

Aerial maneuvers
Units of rate